Lynne Rudder Baker (February 14, 1944 – December 24, 2017) was an American philosopher and author. At the time of her death she was a Distinguished Professor at the University of Massachusetts Amherst.

Born in Atlanta, Georgia in 1944 to Virginia Bennett and James Rudder, she earned her Ph.D. in 1972 from Vanderbilt University after beginning her graduate studies at Johns Hopkins University in 1967. She was a fellow of the National Humanities Center (1983–1984) and the Woodrow Wilson International Center for Scholars (1988–1989).

She joined the faculty of UMass Amherst in 1989. She is the author of several books, notably Saving Belief: A Critique of Physicalism (1987), Explaining Attitudes: A Practical Approach to the Mind (1995), Persons and Bodies: A Constitution View (2000), and The Metaphysics of Everyday Life: An Essay in Practical Realism (2007).

Along with several other scholars, Baker delivered the 2001 Gifford Lectures in Natural Theology at the University of Glasgow, published as The Nature and Limits of Human Understanding (ed. Anthony Sanford, T & T Clark, 2003). She was a member of the Amherst Grace Episcopal Church. Baker died of heart disease on December 24, 2017, in Amherst, Massachusetts, aged 73.

Views on science and religion
Baker imputes to scientists generally the view that human beings are just another species rather than a special creation of God:
Yet, the sciences are relentless in taking human beings to be just another part of nature: a little more complex than chimpanzees, but not essentially different—certainly not morally and ontologically special. We are just one species among many."

Notes

External links
 Biography and summary of Gifford Lectures, by Brannon Hancock
 Lynne Rudder Baker, UMass Faculty Directory

1944 births
2017 deaths
Philosophers from Massachusetts
Christian philosophers
University of Massachusetts Amherst faculty
Vanderbilt University alumni
American women philosophers
20th-century American philosophers
21st-century American philosophers
Writers from Atlanta
Philosophers from Georgia (U.S. state)
The Westminster Schools alumni
20th-century American women
21st-century American women